Consumers Cigar Box Company, also known as Red Lion Woodcraft Inc., is a historic factory located at Red Lion, York County, Pennsylvania.  It was built in 1921, with additions in 1925 and 1935-1936. It is a large two-story, "L"-shaped building.  It is built of concrete block and brick with a gable roof and stepped parapet.  Cigar boxes were manufactured until the 1950s.  The building housed various manufacturing operations until 1979.

It was added to the National Register of Historic Places in 1999.  It is located in the Red Lion Borough Historic District.

References

Industrial buildings and structures on the National Register of Historic Places in Pennsylvania
Industrial buildings completed in 1921
Industrial buildings completed in 1936
Buildings and structures in York County, Pennsylvania
Cigars
Tobacco buildings in the United States
National Register of Historic Places in York County, Pennsylvania